is a Japanese footballer currently playing as a goalkeeper for Azul Claro Numazu.

Career
In August 2019, Tani joined Taiwanese team Taichung Futuro F.C. on a short-term loan.

On 14 December 2022, Tani announcement officially transfer to J3 club, Azul Claro Numazu for ahead of 2023 season.

Career statistics

Club
.

Notes

References

External links

1993 births
Living people
Association football people from Tokyo
Nihon University alumni
Japanese footballers
Taiwanese footballers
Japanese expatriate footballers
Association football goalkeepers
Tercera División players
J3 League players
Taiwan Football Premier League players
FC Tokyo players
Albirex Niigata Singapore FC players
Briobecca Urayasu players
YSCC Yokohama players
Taichung Futuro F.C. players
Azul Claro Numazu players
Japanese expatriate sportspeople in Singapore
Expatriate footballers in Singapore
Japanese expatriate sportspeople in Spain
Expatriate footballers in Spain